Manavi is a village in the Georgian province of Kakheti. It is famous for its yellowish green wine, Manavis Mtsvane. In Georgia, wine drinking is central to the culture and is especially recommended for long celebrations. Olympic judoka Guram Gogolauri was born here.

See also
 Kakheti

References

Populated places in Kakheti